Durgapur Institute of Advanced Technology and Management (DIATM), in Durgapur, West Bengal, India offers degree engineering courses which are affiliated to West Bengal State Council of Technical Education (WBSCTE) and degree courses which are affiliated to West Bengal University of Technology (WBUT).

See also

References

External links 

https://web.archive.org/web/20090619091259/http://www.wbut.net/

Universities and colleges in Paschim Bardhaman district
Colleges affiliated to West Bengal University of Technology
Education in Durgapur, West Bengal
Educational institutions established in 2002
2002 establishments in West Bengal